I Love You 3x a Day (stylized onscreen as I ♥ You 3x a Day) is a 1988 Filipino fantasy comedy film co-written and directed by Mike Relon Makiling and starring Jimmy Santos in his first lead role. It also stars Carmi Martin, Nova Villa, Ruffa Gutierrez, Gelli de Belen, Cheenee de Leon, and Kampee De Leon. Produced by Viva Films, the film was released on November 9, 1988. Critic Lav Diaz gave the film a positive review, giving special praise to Santos for his unique comedic style in comparison to other Filipino comedians.

Plot
Webster Shakespeare Cubangbang deludedly thinks he has mastered the English language, and his university dean decides to give him his diploma so that he does not return to college to bother his professors. Eventually, Webster ends up as an English teacher at Mababangloob High School, where he is subjected to ridicule and pranks by his students while falling for a fellow teacher named Grace. Out of frustration, he tries to jump off a bridge but is rescued by a fairy godmother, who helps him by granting him the ability to make and people come after him whenever he says the line "I love you three times a day". His students later warm up to him, and he later helps them win a spelling bee. At the school's victory party, Webster finally confesses his love for Grace, but is mobbed by the entire school who hears him say the magic lines.

Cast

Jimmy Santos as Webster Shakespeare Cubangbang
Carmi Martin as Grace Samson
Nova Villa as Saucy Matukoy
Ruffa Gutierrez as Agnes Reyes
Jigo Garcia as Max
Geli de Belen as Doro/Dora
Kimpee de Leon as Tomas "Tom" Cruz
Cheenee de Leon as Gerry Cruz
Dingdong Avanzado as Archie
Rene Requiestas as a janitor
Fe delos Reyes as Fritzi
Ronald Jayme as George
Chinkee as Sashimi Matukoy
Gary Boy Garcia as Dennis
Joey de Leon as Venus the fairy godmother
Dexter Doria as Stella
Moody Diaz as Webster's mother
Lucio Mailas as Charles Dacuycoy
Bert Manzueto as Mr. Arrogante
Manolette Ripol as Butch
Paeng Giant as Don Leon Mababangloob
Emeng Barcelon as Webster's neighbor
Phillip Salvador as Afuang
Vic Sotto as a security guard
Jimmy Fabregas as Dean Jaime Cabunglaw
Julio Diaz as Raymond
Val Sotto as Agila
Spanky Rigor as spelling bee emcee
Mely Tagasa as spelling bee umpire
Yoyong Martirez as spelling bee coach
Zorayda Sanchez as Grace's maid
Beverly Salviejo as a poolside beauty
Ilonah Jean as a volleyball player

Annabelle Rama has an uncredited cameo in the film as Agnes' mother

Production

Background
Comedian and former basketball player Jimmy Santos began using the catchphrase "I love you three times a day" in the sitcom Dina. By the late 1980s, the catchphrase became his signature line on television.

Release
I Love You 3x a Day was released on November 9, 1988. Joey de Leon's daughter Cheenee de Leon and Dingdong Avanzado sang a duet together on Regal Family to promote the film.

Critical response
Lav Diaz, writing for the Manila Standard, gave a positive review to I Love You 3x a Day, praising Jimmy Santos' unique style of comedy which involves a distinctive rambling use of the English language; he noted that in comparison to other Filipino comedians who also distort the English language, Santos' jokes and delivery are new. Diaz also praised the decision to pair Santos with Carmi Martin, whom he called "one of the very sturdy promoters of the stupid revolution", and credited the success of the film's comedy to Rene Requiestas, Jimmy Fabregas, Nova Villa, and Paeng Giant in addition to Santos' performance. However, he criticized the group of Jigo Garcia, Kimpee de Leon and Dingdong Avanzado for being "soaked in corniness".

References

External links

1988 films
1980s fantasy comedy films
Filipino-language films
Films about language
Films about spelling competitions
Films directed by Mike Relon Makiling
Philippine fantasy comedy films
Philippine high school films
Viva Films films